Carlos María Domínguez (born 23 April 1955 in Buenos Aires) is an Argentine writer and journalist who has lived in Montevideo since 1989.

Biography
Domínguez began his career in the Argentine magazine, Crisis. Afterwards, he specialized in literary criticism, joining the Uruguayan weeklies Brecha, Búsqueda, and the cultural supplement of EL PAIS.

Work
Domínguez has written around 20 books, including novels, short stories, travel chronicles, biographies, and plays.

Pozo de Vargas (novel), Emecé, Buenos Aires, 1985.
Bicicletas negras (novel), Arca, Montevideo, 1990.
Construcción de la noche. La vida de Juan Carlos Onetti (biography), Planeta, Buenos Aires, 1993.
La mujer hablada (novel), Cal y Canto, Montevideo, 1995.
El bastardo. La vida de Roberto de las Carreras y su madre Clara (biografía), Cal y Canto, Montevideo, 1997.
La confesión de Johnny (story), Ediciones de la Banda Oriental, Montevideo, 1998.
El compás de oro (Entrevistas), Ediciones de la Gente, Buenos Aires, 1999.
Tola Invernizzi. La rebelión de la ternura (biography), Trilce, Montevideo, 2001.
Delitos de amores crueles. Las mujeres uruguayas y la justicia (chronicles), Alfaguara, Montevideo, 2001.
Una joya por cada rata. Memorias de un asaltante de bancos (chronicles), Cal y Canto, Montevideo, 2001.
Tres muescas en mi carabina (novel), Alfaguara, Montevideo, 2002.
La casa de papel (novel), Ediciones de la Banda Oriental, Montevideo, 2002.
Escritos en el agua (chronicles), Ediciones de la Banda Oriental, Montevideo, 2002.
Historias del polvo y el camino (chronicles), Ed. de la Gente, Buenos Aires, 2002.
El norte profundo (chronicles), Ediciones de la Banda Oriental, Montevideo, 2004.
Mares baldíos (chronicles), Eichborn, Frankfurt, 2005 (Wüste Meere).
Las puertas de la tierra (chronicles), Ediciones de la Banda Oriental, Montevideo, 2007.
La costa ciega (novel), Mondadori, Buenos Aires, 2009.
24 ilusiones por segundo : La historia de Cinemateca Uruguaya (chronicles), Cinemateca Uruguaya, Montevideo, 2013.

Awards
 With his novel La mujer hablada he won the Bartolomé Hidalgo Prize in 1995
 Prize of the Spanish Embassy in honor of Juan Carlos Onetti for Tres muescas en mi carabina (2002)
 National Essay Prize for Escritos en el agua (2002)
 Lolita Rubial Prize for La casa de papel, which was translated into more than 20 languages (2002)
 Buch des Monats, Darmstadt, Germany, 2004
 Jury der Jungen Leser, Vienna, Austria, 2005

References

External links
 Entrevista de Silvina Friera, Página 12
 Entrevista de Gabriel Lagos, La diaria
 La costa ciega, Radio
 Tres muescas en mi carabina, entrevista 
 La casa de papel, en The New York Times
 El bastardo…, entrevista en La Nación

1955 births
Writers from Buenos Aires
Argentine emigrants to Uruguay
Argentine male writers
Uruguayan male writers
Uruguayan journalists
Argentine biographers
Uruguayan biographers
Living people